Gerald Eastmure may refer to:

 Gerald Eastmure (cricketer) (1917–1996), English cricketer
 Gerald Eastmure (footballer) (born 1935), former Australian rules footballer